Adrián Marín Gómez (born 9 January 1997) is a Spanish professional footballer who plays as a left-back for Portuguese club Gil Vicente.

Club career

Villarreal
Born in Torre-Pacheco, Region of Murcia, Marín joined local Villarreal CF's academy in 2009 at the age of 12. He made his senior debut with the C team in the 2013–14 season in the Tercera División, and also appeared with the reserves in the Segunda División B the same year.

In May 2014, Marín was called up to the main squad by manager Marcelino García Toral for the preseason trip to Asia. He also appeared in friendlies against CF Reus Deportiu and Middlesbrough.

Marín played his first match as a professional on 28 August 2014, coming on as a substitute for Jaume Costa in the 57th minute of a 4–0 home win against FC Astana in the play-off round of the UEFA Europa League. His maiden La Liga appearance occurred on 14 September, as he started in the 0–0 draw at Granada CF.

On 20 July 2016, Marín was loaned to fellow top-tier club CD Leganés in a season-long deal. Upon returning, he extended his contract until 2021 and was definitely promoted to the first team.

Alavés
On 9 August 2018, Marín signed a three-year deal with Deportivo Alavés. During his two-and-a-half-year spell at the Mendizorrotza Stadium, he appeared in only 28 competitive games.

Granada
Marín joined Granada CF on 1 February 2021, on a two-and-a-half-year contract. On 30 August, he moved to Primeira Liga side F.C. Famalicão on a one-year loan with a buyout clause. He totalled 33 appearances during his stint at the latter, scoring four goals.

Gil Vicente
On 13 August 2022, Marín agreed to a two-year deal at Gil Vicente F.C. also in the Portuguese top flight.

International career
Marín won his only cap for Spain at under-21 level on 24 March 2016, in a 3–0 home loss against Croatia in the 2017 UEFA European Championship qualifiers.

Career statistics

References

External links

1997 births
Living people
Spanish footballers
Footballers from the Region of Murcia
Association football defenders
La Liga players
Segunda División B players
Tercera División players
Villarreal CF C players
Villarreal CF B players
Villarreal CF players
CD Leganés players
Deportivo Alavés players
Granada CF footballers
Primeira Liga players
F.C. Famalicão players
Gil Vicente F.C. players
Spain youth international footballers
Spain under-21 international footballers
Spanish expatriate footballers
Expatriate footballers in Portugal
Spanish expatriate sportspeople in Portugal